The Massachusetts Democratic Party (MassDems) is the affiliate of the Democratic Party in the Commonwealth of Massachusetts. It is chaired by Gus Bickford. It is currently the dominant party in the state, controlling all nine of Massachusetts' U.S. House seats, both U.S. Senate seats, the governorship, and supermajorities in both houses of the state legislature.

Overview
Headquartered in Boston, Massachusetts, the Massachusetts Democratic State Committee is responsible for publicizing the platform of the Massachusetts Democratic Party, the state affiliate of the United States Democratic Party.  According to the party charter, the State Committee is charged with conducting state-level campaigns for the Democratic Party, coordinating efforts to fill vacancies in nominating candidates to state and congressional offices, and creating and disseminating information regarding official Democratic Party policies and positions.  The Committee also engages in fundraising initiatives to support its operations, and coordinates local caucuses and the Democratic State Conventions.

The State Committee comprises 160 elected members, and add-on and ex officio seats, all of whom must be registered Democrats.  Current officers include Gus Bickford, Chairman; Debra Kozikowski, Vice-Chair; Leon Brathwaite, Vice-Chair; Carol Aloisi, Secretary; Kathleen Gasperine, Treasurer; Thomas McGee, Chair Emeritus; and Veronica Martinez, Executive Director.  Non-officers include two men and two women from each state senatorial district, Democratic National Committee members from Massachusetts, and roughly 120 additional committee members comprising various underrepresented minority groups, including veterans, gay and lesbian citizens, and college-aged youth representatives.  Democratic statewide officers, Governor's Councilors, US Representatives and Senators, and the top Democrat in each chamber of the state legislature are ex officio members.  Any person who has served for twenty years on the state committee remains a member so long as that person remains registered as a Democrat in Massachusetts.

Eighty of the State Committee members (one of each gender per Senate district) must be elected through presidential primary ballots.  The other 80 (one of each gender per Senate district) are elected at Senate district conferences by local town and ward committee members. All State Committee members serve four-year terms.  There are numerous subcommittees are of the Massachusetts Democratic State Committee, including the Affirmative Action and Outreach Committee, the By-Laws Committee, the Campaign Services Committee, the Charter Amendments Committee, the Communications Committee, the Credentials Committee, the Disability Outreach Committee, the Field Services Committee, the Finance Committee, the LGBT Outreach Committee, the Labor Outreach Committee, the Massachusetts Democratic Latino Caucus Committee, the Public Policy Committee, the Rules Committee, the Rural Committee, the Internship-Scholarship Committee, the Senior Outreach Committee, the Site Selection Committee, the State Judicial Council Committee, the Veterans and Military Families Outreach Committee, the Women's Outreach Committee, and the Youth Services Committee.  Subcommittees are chaired by State Committee members.

Affirmative Action Outreach Co-Chairs: Dylan Hayre, Dorothea Jones, Nadeem Mazen

By-Laws Co-Chairs: Jim DiTullio, Teresa Walsh

Campaign Services Co-Chairs: Joe Kaplan, Amanda Smith

Charter Amendments Co-Chairs: Sandi Bagley, Bryan Barash

Communications Co-Chiars: Elaine Almquist, John Bowes

Credentials Co-Chairs: Carol Aloisi, Alana Murphy, Steve Owens

Disability Outreach Co-Chairs: Cheryl Cummings, David Perelman

Field Services Co-Chairs: Jason Palitsch, Karen Payne

JFK Scholarship Co-Chairs: Brenda Braithwaite, Charlotte Golar-Ritchie

Judicial Council: Roger Lau

Labor Outreach Co-Chairs: Ed Collins, Cathy Dwyer

Latino Caucus Co-Chairs: Marcia Cruz Redding, Juan Lopez

LGBT Co-Chairs: Steve Driscoll, Tyler Carlton, Holly Ryan

Personnel Co-Chairs: Andrea Cabral, Mark DiSalvo

Public Policy Co-Chairs: Ralph Edwards, Jamie Eldridge, Martina Jackson, Ann Roosevelt

Resolutions Co-Chairs: Alex Pratt, Marianne Rutter

Resource Development Co-Chairs: Tom Holloway, Nicole LaChapelle

Rules: Bill Eddy

Rural Issues Co-Chairs: Lee Harrison, Lisa Mosczynski

Senior Outreach Co-Chairs: Russ Ashton, Allyne Pecevich

Site Selection Co-Chairs: Sally Rizzo, Ron Valerio

Veterans & Military Families Co-Chairs: Chuck Battle, Christine Tron

Women's Outreach Co-Chairs: Linda Dorcena Forry, Norma Shulman, Megan Costello

Youth Services Co-Chairs: Jeremy Comeau, Alicia Delvento

History

The Massachusetts Democratic Party and the National Democratic Party trace their roots to the latter half of the 18th century, when politicians forged alliances based on common national interests.  In 1792, Thomas Jefferson founded the Democratic-Republican Party, commonly referred to as the "party of the common man."  Jefferson's new party was adamantly opposed to what it saw as the Federalist Party's elitist agenda.  Jefferson served two consecutive terms as the first Democratic Republican President of the United States beginning in 1800. James Madison, another Democratic-Republican, succeeded Jefferson in 1808, followed by fellow party member James Monroe in 1812.
The national party was briefly divided during the election of John Quincy Adams in 1824, in which four Democratic candidates ran for office. Andrew Jackson assumed the leadership of the party following this period, and reunified its constituents.  Jackson defined the party's platform and established the Democratic National Convention as a means of organizing and implementing the party's agenda on a national scale.
With consecutive presidential victories in 1828 and 1832, Jackson succeeded in solidifying the Democratic-Republicans as a powerful national political party.  The name was simplified to the Democratic Party at the Democratic National Convention of 1844.

Massachusetts was dominated during the early 19th century by the Federalist Party.  The Federalist position was strengthened when Maine, a Democratic-Republican stronghold, achieved statehood in 1820.  The Democratic Party in Massachusetts was lacking in well-organized structure and strong leadership for much of the post-Jackson 19th century.  Individual factions, including rural groups, immigrants, and factory workers, made up the party rank and file, but were unable to organize effectively to compete with first the Whigs and, after the American Civil War period, the Republicans.  They rarely gained control over the legislature, and only one governor (William Russell) served more than two consecutive one-year terms.

As the 19th century was ending, the party found a new strength in an old ideal. The Democrats' long-held suspicions of aristocratic leaders and the wealthy elite struck a chord with immigrants and working class citizens during the first half of the 19th century. Irish Americans gained a measure of organizational power in the party beginning late in the 19th century, but it was not until the 1920s that the Irish, along with other immigrant groups and working-class interests, were able to forge a strong party structure that united their interests and consistently produced electable leadership.  By the mid-20th century, the party was successfully contending with Republicans for all major state offices, and had by the 1970s achieved its present dominant position in the state legislature.

20th and 21st centuries
Despite numerous Republicans elected as governor, the Democratic Party was at the forefront of Massachusetts politics for much of the 20th century.  Massachusetts Democrats, from John F. Kennedy to Deval Patrick, have played a prominent role in advancing the party's agenda and prominence on a local and national scale.  The state's strength as a Democratic stronghold is such that it has not voted for a Republican for president since 1984, when Ronald Reagan was reelected.

The 2006 elections solidified the Democratic Party's dominance in Massachusetts, when Deval Patrick became the first Democratic governor in 16 years.  It was moderated in 2014 with the election of Republican Charlie Baker as governor.  Currently, every Congressional delegate from Massachusetts is a Democrat.  Democrats also occupy all constitutional offices in the Commonwealth's state government which includes governor and lieutenant governor (held by Maura Healey and Kim Driscoll), Attorney General Andrea Campbell, Auditor Diana DiZoglio, Secretary of State William F. Galvin, and Treasurer Deb Goldberg.  The party holds super-majorities in both the state House of Representatives and the state Senate.

Current elected officials

Members of Congress

U.S. Senate
Democrats have controlled both of Massachusetts's seats in the U.S. Senate since 2012:

U.S. House of Representatives
Out of the nine seats Massachusetts is apportioned in the U.S. House of Representatives, all nine are held by Democrats:

Statewide offices
Democrats control all six of the elected statewide offices:
Governor: Maura Healey
Lieutenant Governor: Kim Driscoll
Secretary of Commonwealth: William F. Galvin
Attorney General: Andrea Campbell
Treasurer: Deb Goldberg
Auditor: Diana DiZoglio

State legislature

 Senate
 Current senators
Senate President: Karen Spilka (2nd Middlesex and Norfolk)
Senate Majority Leader: Cynthia Stone Creem (1st Middlesex and Norfolk)
 House
 Current representatives
House Speaker: Ronald Mariano (3rd Norfolk)
House Majority Leader: Michael Moran (18th Suffolk)

Mayoral offices
Some of the state's major cities have Democratic mayors, though they are officially elected on a non-partisan basis. As of 2021, Democrats control the mayor's offices in eight of Massachusetts's ten largest cities: 
Boston (1): Michelle Wu
Worcester (2): Joseph Petty
Springfield (3): Domenic Sarno
Cambridge (4): Sumbul Siddiqui
Brockton (6): Robert F. Sullivan
New Bedford (7): Jon Mitchell
Lynn (9): Jared C. Nicholson
Fall River (10): Paul Coogan

Past elected officials

U.S. Presidents
John F. Kennedy (1961–63)

U.S. Senators
Robert Rantoul Jr. (1851)
David I. Walsh (1919–25, 1926–47)
Marcus Coolidge (1931–37)
John F. Kennedy (1953–60)
Benjamin A. Smith II (1960–62)
Ted Kennedy (1962–2009)
Paul Tsongas (1979–85)
John Kerry (1985–2013)
Paul G. Kirk (2009–10)
Mo Cowan (2013)

U.S. Representatives

before 1874

1875–1899

1900–1924

1925–1949

1950–1974

1975–1999

Governors

State legislature

Speakers of the House

President of the Senate

Other statewide offices

Attorney General

Treasurer

Secretary of the Commonwealth

Auditor

List of party chairpersons

See also
Massachusetts Republican Party
Political party strength in Massachusetts
 2020 Massachusetts general election

References

Notes

Further reading
Abrams, Richard M. Conservatism in a Progressive Era: Massachusetts Politics 1900-1912. Cambridge, Massachusetts: Harvard University Press, 1964
Brown, Richard D. Massachusetts: A Bicentennial History. New York: W.W. Norton & Company, Inc., 1978
Darling, Arthur B. Jacksonian Democracy in Massachusetts. The American Historical Review, Vol. 29, No.2. (Jan, 1924), pp. 271–287
Gamm, Gerald H. The Making of the New Deal Democrats: Voting Behavior and Realignment in Boston, 1920-1940. Chicago: University of Chicago Press, 1989
Goodman, Paul. The Democratic-Republicans of Massachusetts: Politics in a Young Republic. Cambridge, Massachusetts: Harvard University Press, 1964
Hennessy, Michael E. Four Decades of Massachusetts Politics: 1890-1935. Norwood, Mass.: The Norwood Press, 1935
Merriam, C.E. State Central Committees: A Study of Party Organization. Political Science Quarterly, Vol. 19, No. 2. (June, 1904), pp. 224–233.
Robinson, William A. Jeffersonian Democracy in New England. New Haven, Conn.: Yale University Press, 1916.

External links
Massachusetts Democratic Party
College Democrats of Massachusetts (CDM)
Young Democrats of Massachusetts
Progressive Democrats of Massachusetts

 
 
Massachusetts
Democratic Party